Sitai  Assembly constituency is an assembly constituency in Cooch Behar district in the Indian state of West Bengal. It is reserved for scheduled castes.

Overview
As per orders of the Delimitation Commission, No. 6 Sitai Assembly constituency covers Sitai community development block and Bara Atiabari I, Bara Atiabari II, Bara Soulmari, Bhetaguri II, Gitaldaha I, Gitaldaha II, Gosanimari I, Gosanimari II, Matalhat, Okrabari and Petla Putimari II gram panchayats of Dinhata I community development block.

Sitai Assembly constituency is part of No. 1  Cooch Behar (Lok Sabha constituency) (SC).

Members of Legislative Assembly

Election results

2021

2011
In the 2011 elections, Keshab Chandra Roy of Congress defeated his nearest rival Dipak Kumar Roy of AIFB.

1972-2006
In the 2006 state assembly elections, Dr. Md. Fazle Haque of Congress won the Sitai seat defeating his nearest rival Nripendra Nath Roy of Forward Bloc. Contests in most years were multi cornered but only winners and runners are being mentioned. In 2001, Nripendra Nath Roy of Forward Bloc defeated Dr. Md. Fazle Haque of Congress. In 1996, Dr. Md. Fazle Haque, Independent, defeated Nripendra Nath Roy of Forward Bloc. Dipak Sengupta of Forward Block defeated Dr. Md. Fazle Haque of Congress in 1991, 1987 and 1982, and Sushil Roy Sarkar of Congress in 1977.

1967-1972
Dr. Md Fazle Haque of Congress won the seat in 1972, 1971, 1969 and 1967. Prior to that the seat was not there.

References

Assembly constituencies of West Bengal
Politics of Cooch Behar district